Famine response can refer to:

Famine relief, the societal response to famine
Starvation response, the physiological and biochemical response to starvation